Palm Beach Currumbin State High School (PBC High School or PBC) is an independent co-educational public school (government funded), in the Gold Coast suburb of Currumbin, Queensland, Australia. PBC is Queensland's southernmost coastal High school and caters for a large catchment area of students.

Excellence programs

Academic Excellence 

Academic Excellence was established in 2001, specifically created for students who desire to achieve the most out of their scholastic studies. Students that participate study a modified curriculum to further streamline their progression into the senior school.

Creative Arts Excellence 
The Creative Arts Excellence program focuses on developing ambition, artistry and academia in students. The program includes specialised skills training, arts showcases and projects.

Sports Excellence 
In 1996, the Sports Excellence program was created to allow students in years 8-12 excelling in sport to play and train at a more professional level. The program helps students develop as athletes as well as the fair play and leadership aspects that accompany it. ‘Sport Ex’ is taken as 1 of 6 chosen subjects, which enables more time per week in the program. Sports Excellence now accommodates students in AFL, Basketball, Kayaking, Netball, Soccer, Rugby League, Tennis, Track & Field, Surfing and Touch Football.

Media appearances 
The school was used for the TV series Mortified around 2005 - 2007. In the first series, the school was used as Sunburn Beach Primary, and, in the second series, was used as Driftwood High School.

Notable alumni

Rugby League
 Clint Amos – former North Queensland and Gold Coast Titans player
 Scott Anderson – former Melbourne, Brisbane and Wakefield Trinity player
 Aaron Booth – player for the Melbourne Storm
 Darius Boyd – player for the Brisbane Broncos and Australian international 
 Jed Cartwright - player for the Penrith Panthers
 Sam Cook – former New Zealand Warriors player
 Cameron Cullen – former Gold Coast Titans and Manly player
 Brad Davis – former Gold Coast Titans player
 Tom Dearden – player for the Brisbane Broncos
 Kane Elgey – former Gold Coast Titans and Manly player
 Jaelen Feeney – former Newcastle Knights player
 Jamal Fogarty – player for the Gold Coast Titans
 Luke Garner – player for the Wests Tigers
 Ben Hannant – former Sydney Roosters, Brisbane, Canterbury and North Queensland player and Australian international
 Keegan Hipgrave – player for the Gold Coast Titans
 Jahrome Hughes – player for the Melbourne Storm and New Zealand international
 Justin Hunt – former South Sydney, Parramatta, St George Illawarra and Wests Tigers player
 Ben Ikin – former Gold Coast Seagulls, North Sydney and Brisbane player and Australian international
 Sam Irwin – former Gold Coast Titans and Featherstone player
 Ryan James – captain of the Gold Coast Titans
 Kevin Kingston – former Cronulla, Parramatta and Penrith player
 Tom Kingston – former Gold Coast Titans player
 Karl Lawton – player for the New Zealand Warriors
 Kayne Lawton – former Gold Coast Titans and AS Carcassonne player
 Will Matthews – player for the Gold Coast Titans
 Brent McConnell former North Queensland and Brisbane player
 Steve Michaels – former Brisbane, Gold Coast Titans and Hull F.C. player
 Kai O'Donnell – player for the Canberra Raiders
 Luke O'Dwyer – former Parramatta and Gold Coast Titans player
 Keenan Palasia – player for the Brisbane Broncos
 Dimitri Pelo – former Catalans Dragons and Canberra player and French international
 Lloyd Perrett – former Canterbury and Manly player
 Sam Perrett – former Sydney Roosters and Canterbury player and New Zealand international
 Kevin Proctor – player for the Gold Coast Titans and New Zealand international
 Jordan Rankin – player for the Castleford Tigers
 Jordan Rapana – former Gold Coast Titans and Canberra Raiders player and New Zealand international
 Ryan Simpkins – former Gold Coast Titans player
 David Tangata-Toa – former Hull KR and Celtic Crusaders player
 Cody Walker – player for the South Sydney Rabbitohs
 Shannon Walker – former Gold Coast Titans player and Australia rugby sevens international
 Anthony Watts – former Cronulla, North Queensland and Widnes player
 Craig Weston – former Gold Coast Seagulls, Eastern Suburbs, South Queensland, Huddersfield, Doncaster and Widnes player
 Shane Wright – player for the North Queensland Cowboys

Australian Rules
 Lauren Ahrens – player for the Gold Coast Suns
 Claye Beams – former Brisbane Lions player
 Dayne Beams – former Brisbane Lions / Collingwood player
 Brayden Crossley – former Gold Coast Suns player
 Jacob Dawson – former Gold Coast Suns player
 Sam Gilbert – former St Kilda player
 Caleb Graham – player for the Gold Coast Suns
 Jacob Heron – former Gold Coast Suns player
 Jesse Joyce – former Gold Coast Suns player
 Marc Lock – former Gold Coast Suns player
 Brad Scheer – former Gold Coast Suns player
 Max Spencer – former Gold Coast Suns player
 Joel Wilkinson – former Gold Coast Suns player

Football
 Mitch Nichols – former Australian international
 Shane Smeltz – former New Zealand international

Surfing
 Mick Fanning – former three-time ASP World Tour champion
 Joel Parkinson – one-time ASP World Tour champion

Other
 Drew Anthony – performer, director, choreographer and producer

References

Schools on the Gold Coast, Queensland
Public high schools in Queensland
Currumbin, Queensland
Educational institutions established in 1972
1972 establishments in Australia